SPECpower_ssj2008 is the first industry-standard benchmark that evaluates the power and performance characteristics of volume server class computers. It is available from the Standard Performance Evaluation Corporation (SPEC). SPECpower_ssj2008 is SPEC's first attempt at defining server power measurement standards.  It was introduced in December, 2007.

Several SPEC member companies contributed to the development of the new power-performance measurement standard, including AMD, Dell, Fujitsu Siemens Computers, HP, Intel, IBM, and Sun Microsystems.

See also
 Average CPU power
 EEMBC EnergyBench
 IT energy management
 Performance per watt

References

 Official SPEC website

Benchmarks (computing)
Evaluation of computers

bs:SPEC
de:Standard Performance Evaluation Corporation
es:SPEC
ja:Standard Performance Evaluation Corporation
pl:SPEC (organizacja)